Lippman is a surname. Notable people with the surname include:

People
 Jonathan Lippman (born 1945), American jurist
 Laura Lippman (born 1959), American author of detective fiction
 Abby Lippman (1939–2017), Canadian epidemiologist and women's rights activist
 Andrew B. Lippman (fl. 2000), American researcher
 Doris Troth Lippman (fl. 2000), American professor of nursing
 Stanley B. Lippman (born 1950), American computer scientist and author

Fictional characters
 Mr. Lippman, a recurring character in  Seinfeld

See also
 Lipman
 Lipmann
 Lippmann